Holmbury was the name of two ships of the Houlder Line.

Ship names